James Cummins may refer to:

 James Cummins (poet), American poet
 James Turner Cummins (1842–1912), British military officer in the Indian Army
 James Robert Cummins (1847–1929), American criminal
 James (Jack) Cummins (1773–1849), Texas farmer, public official and colonist

See also 
 Jim Cummins (disambiguation)
 James Cummings (disambiguation)
 Cummins (surname)